Olivier Patru (1604 – 16 January 1681) was a French lawyer and writer. He was born and died in Paris.

External links
 Œuvres diverses on the Cujas Library website: tome premier; tome second.
 

1604 births
1681 deaths
17th-century French writers
17th-century French male writers
17th-century French lawyers
Translators to French
17th-century French translators